Radio Active is a Canadian sitcom television series broadcast on YTV, based on the Quebec French series Radio Enfer, about group of students at Upper Redwood High managing their own school radio station, called Radio Active.

Radio Active ran for a total of 78 episodes and three seasons dating from September 12, 1998, to March 17, 2001.

Premise
Radio Active follows a group of students at Upper Redwood High who have a radio show. Chaos follows as the group try to work together and watching out for the sneaky Ms. Noelle Atoll who always believes they're up to something.

Cast and characters

Main cast
 Giancarlo Caltabiano as George S. Goodwin III: Known to like Normal Man comics and speaks fondly of his uncle. Though not exactly the most intelligent member of the group, his eccentricity adds variety to the school's radio broadcasts. He has a distinct hairstyle, consisting of many bleached-blond spikes which have been shown to be sharp and hard enough to pierce apples.
 Lucinda Davis as Tanya Panda: Tanya is quiet and enjoys reading horoscopes. She often tries to make peace among the group. She and Morgan are best friends.
 Melissa Galianos as Morgan Leigh: Morgan is the productive, witty and reliable one in the group. She strives to get perfect grades and frequently clashes with Kevin, Roger, and Blair.
 Vik Sahay as Kevin Calvin (Season 1): The captain of the hockey team and all around average jock. He has a big ego and speaks often of the babes of Upper Redwood High. Kevin is frequently the target of Ms Atoll's ire.
 Michael Yarmush as Ethan St. John (Season 1): Ethan fears Miss Atoll and frequently sucks up to her. He admires Kevin's ability to attract girls and appears to have a slight crush on Morgan.
 Ryan Wilner as Roger Richards (seasons 2–3): Roger is one of, if not the most, intelligent of the group. He always gets good marks and is known to suck up to Ms. Atoll. However, he is notably uncool and can be somewhat self-centered.
 Andrew Walker as Blair Resnicky (seasons 2–3): An athletic, arrogant, dim-witted new student who joins Radio Active. He is quite popular with the girls at Upper Redwood and his macho attitude frequently clashes with Morgan.
 Robert Higden as Angus B. Noseworthy: The Vice Principal in charge of discipline, however is laid back and has no self-discipline. He often begins a speech with "I remember when I was your age,...". He and Ms. Atoll attended Upper Redwood as students when they were still in high school.
 Susan Glover as Noelle Atoll: The supervising teacher in charge of Radio Active, whom the group dislikes. Ms. Atoll is an English teacher and tends to hand out multiple detentions for those who work at Radio Active.
 Vanessa Lengies as Sarah Leigh: Morgan's little sister, who constantly annoys and interrupts the group. Mostly noted for her mail delivery on roller blades.

Episodes

Season 1: 1998–99

Season 2: 1999–2000

Season 3: 2000–01

External links

 Radio Active on Ciné Télé Action
 

1998 Canadian television series debuts
2001 Canadian television series endings
1990s Canadian children's television series
1990s Canadian high school television series
2000s Canadian children's television series
2000s Canadian high school television series
Canadian television spin-offs
Fictional radio stations
Television series about teenagers
Television shows filmed in Montreal
YTV (Canadian TV channel) original programming
1990s Canadian sitcoms
2000s Canadian sitcoms
Television series by Corus Entertainment